The King Sejong Station is a research station for the Korea Antarctic Research Program that is named after King Sejong the Great of Joseon (1397–1450).

Established on February 17, 1988, it consists of 11 facility buildings and two observatories, and it is located on the Barton Peninsula (King George Island), it is currently overseen by station chief scientist In-Young Ahn. It experiences a fairly mild climate subsequently drawing many animals for summer breeding.

In the summer, the station supports up to 68 people, including scientists and staff from the Korea Polar Research Institute and guest scientists from other institutions as well. Over winter, it accommodates only 22 engineers and scientists who maintain the station and routinely collect data (meteorological records, oceanographical parameters, etc.), but their main focus is on tracking the general change of the natural environment. Researchers from Korea continually collaborate with various other institutes in Antarctica and the rest of the world by participating in, monitoring, and contributing to the World Meteorological Organization, the Global Sea-level Observing System, the International Seismological Center, and the Intermagnet Project.

The station is usually re-supplied yearly by the RV Onnuri and more frequently by planes flying from Jubany in Argentina and the Chilean Eduardo Frei Base.

The RV Araon was commissioned in 2009, and she supplies South Korea's research stations, including the Jang Bogo Station.

Research
The primary research that is conducted at the King Sejong Station:
Environmental monitoring
Geodesy/mapping
Geomagnetic observations (since 1989)
Glaciology - sea ice zone (since 1998)
Ionospheric/auroral observations (since 1989)
Lower/upper atmospheric science
Meteorological observations
Oceanography
Offshore marine biology
Onshore geology/geophysics
Seismology
Stratospheric ozone monitoring (since 1998)
Terrestrial biology
Tide measurement

In popular culture
The station is used as a basis for the major tournament map King Sejong Station LE in the game of StarCraft II: Heart of the Swarm, a game that is popular amongst South Koreans.

See also
 List of Antarctic research stations
 List of Antarctic field camps

References

External links
 Official website of the Korea Polar Research Institute (KOPRI)
 Introduction of the King Sejong Station in the Official website of KOPRI
 COMNAP Antarctic Facilities
 COMNAP Antarctic Facilities Map

Outposts of the South Shetland Islands
South Korea and the Antarctic
King George Island (South Shetland Islands)
1988 establishments in Antarctica
Sejong the Great